Namdev Bhau: In Search of Silence is a 2018 Indian adventure drama film directed by Dar Gai and starring Namdev Gurav, a chauffeur in real life, in the titular role. The film contains Hindi and Marathi dialogues and was released with Hindi subtitles.

Synopsis 
A 65-year-old chauffeur who travels from Mumbai to Ladakh in search of inner peace and quietude.

Cast 
Namdev Gurav as Namdev Bhau
Aarya Dave as Aaliq
Zoya Hussain as Tara
Geetanjali Naik as Namdev's wife

Production 
Namdev Gurav, a driver for forty-five years, was signed to play a chauffeur in the film. The film was shot in Bombay and Ladakh.

Release
Namdev Bhau was featured as the opening film for the Dharamshala International Film Festival. The film was also featured at the Busan International Film Festival.

Reception
The Hollywood Reporter wrote that "Written and directed by the young Kiev-born, India-based Dar Gai, the film builds slowly but inexorably to a touching surprise ending that exceeds expectations". Firstpost wrote that "Namdev Bhau’s organic and unschooled performance and Dar Gai’s gentle observation of this man who reveals so much while saying so little are the film’s soul. Namdev Bhau: In Search of Silence will resonate with residents of big cities who endure daily sensory overload".

Awards and nominations

References

External links

2018 films
2010s Hindi-language films
2010s Marathi-language films
Films shot in Ladakh
Films shot in Mumbai